The three perfections is a term referring to Chinese , , and  understood and practiced as related endeavors.

The earliest recorded mention known of "the three perfections" is found in The New Book of Tang, where the term is used to describe the work of poet-painter , who, as described by calligrapher Qi Gong, "excelled in poetry, calligraphy, and painting."

Legend holds that the Tang dynasty poets Du Fu and Li Bai were the first to introduce the combination of painting and poetry into one artwork. Several hundred years later, Su Shi, a poet and painter, promoted the use of poetry and painting together. Instruction of artists at the Northern Song Imperial Painting Academy included the integration of poetry and painting.

Examples
 Anchorage on a Rainy Night, Shen Zhou, Chinese, 1427–1509 
 Illustration to the Second Prose Poem on the Red Cliff, Qiao Zhongchang, Chinese, late 11th or early 12th century
 Landscape after Li Bo's poem, Ike Taiga, Japanese, Edo period, 18th century

Gallery

References

Further reading
 Battista, Carolyn. (May 12, 1996). "Show of Three Perfections: Poetry, Painting and Calligraphy." The New York Times.
 Chinese Painting. Metropolitan Museum of Art. 
 The Great Art of China's 'Soundless Poems'. The Schiller Institute.

Chinese art
Song dynasty art
Chinese painting
Chinese poetry
Chinese calligraphy
Japanese art
Japanese painting
Japanese poetry
Japanese calligraphy